British singer Sophie Ellis-Bextor has recorded songs for five studio albums and other projects, including collaborations with other artists. She began her musical career as the main vocalist of the indie rock band Theaudience, whose single "I Know Enough (I Don't Get Enough)" reached the top 25 on the UK Singles Chart. Despite its commercial success, after three years, they were dropped from Mercury Records and split. Following the disbandment of the group, Ellis-Bextor provided vocals for the DJ Spiller's single "Groovejet (If This Ain't Love)", which topped the UK Singles Chart. She then started writing and recording for a debut album.

After releasing her debut single "Take Me Home", Polydor Records issued her first studio album Read My Lips on 27 August 2001 which primarily tended towards a disco and electronica-inspired sound. The album and its reissue spawned four singles, including the worldwide success "Murder on the Dancefloor". On 16 October 2003 Ellis-Bextor released her sophomore studio album Shoot from the Hip. For the album, Ellis-Bextor worked with many musicians, including Alex James and Bernard Butler, which resulted in a Europop-influenced sound. It spawned the successful singles "Mixed Up World" and "I Won't Change You", which reached the top 10 of the UK Singles Chart.

On 28 March 2005 a collaboration between Busface and Ellis-Bextor—who was credited as Mademoiselle E.B.—titled "Circles (Just My Good Time)" was released. On 21 May 2007 Ellis-Bextor's third studio album Trip the Light Fantastic was released under Fascination Records. For the album, Ellis-Bextor worked with several writers and producers such as Greg Kurstin, Xenomania and Dimitri Tikovoi, which went towards an electro, pop and dance atmosphere. It produced the singles "Catch You", "Me and My Imagination" and "Today the Sun's on Us". In 2009 and 2010 Ellis-Bextor collaborated with the DJs Freemasons and Armin van Buuren on the dance-pop and EDM  singles "Heartbreak (Make Me a Dancer)" and "Not Giving Up on Love". Junior Caldera also worked with Ellis-Bextor in the song "Can't Fight This Feeling", which was released on 2 April 2011.

On 16 October 2011 she released her fourth studio album Make a Scene under her independent label Douglas Valentine. For the album, she collaborated with several producers including Metronomy, Richard X and Calvin Harris, and delved into nu-disco and pop music. It produced three singles excluding Ellis-Bextor's collaborations with Freemasons, Caldera and van Buuren. Unlike her previous efforts, her fifth studio album Wanderlust saw her working exclusively with Ed Harcourt, resulting in a change of style from her other albums. It was mainly inspired by folk-pop, and has since spawned the singles "Young Blood" and "Runaway Daydreamer".

Songs

Notes
 a In this single release, Ellis-Bextor was credited as Mademoiselle E.B.
 b This was a B-side to "I Won't Change You".
 c This was a B-side to "Catch You".
 d This was a B-side to "Today the Sun's on Us".
 e These were B-sides to "Me and My Imagination".
 f "I Won't Dance With You" was incorrectly typed as "I Won't Dance Without You" on the first UK pressing of Shoot from the Hip.
 g There only exists an acoustic version of B-side "Live It Up".
 h This was a B-side to "Get Over You/Move This Mountain".
 i This was a B-side to "Murder on the Dancefloor".
 j This was a B-side to "Bittersweet".

References

Ellis-Bextor, Sophie